Uneasy Rider can refer to:

"Uneasy Rider," a 1973 song by Charlie Daniels
"Uneasy Rider '88," a similar 1988 song by the Charlie Baniels Band
"Uneasy Rider," an episode in the 9th season (1993) of the British comedy drama Minder.